The Duke Blue Devils men's soccer team represents Duke University in the ACC and in all other men's NCAA Division I Soccer competitions. They won their first and only NCAA tournament in 1986, co-captained by their current head coach, John Kerr Jr. and Mike Linenberger. Facilities included both turf and grass fields, a newly constructed weight room and training room (as of fall 2016), and a student-athlete academic advising facility. John Kerr Jr. is assisted by Michael Brady and Chris Rich.

Current roster

Coaching staff

Source:

Facilities

Koskinen Stadium 

The facility that the Blue Devils Men's Soccer Team uses to play their matches. The stadium holds 7,000 and seats 4,500. The players
play on Bermuda grass. The field is 75x120 yards. There are two locker rooms and a field house inside the stadium. In January 2015, there was a new press box revealed during a grand opening called Kennedy Tower, which was dedicated in honor of Chris and Ana Kennedy. Chris is the Duke Senior Deputy Director of Athletes. The Kennedy Tower, offers press boxes and hospitality suites at the top of Koskinen Stadium. In the fall of 2015, the new Track and Field facility opened on the opposite side of Kennedy Tower. Koskinen Stadium is home for Duke Men's Soccer, Duke Women's Soccer, Duke Men's Lacrosse, and Duke Women's Lacrosse.

Training facilities 
In addition to Koskinen Stadium, Duke has a training ground (751 Practice Fields). 751 has 1 grass field and an additional 18-yard box designed specifically for shooting and goalie training. The team's practice locker rooms are located in the Murray Building, next to Koskinen stadium,

Recruiting

The Blue Devil's have been one of the successful programs with recruiting since 2010. Seven of the last eight recruiting classes have been ranked inside the top 25 nationally. That doesn't change in 2017 as Duke's incoming class has been ranked 11th by College Soccer News. For a more in depth look at Duke's 2017 incoming freshman class, click here.

Alumni in the pros

References

External links

 

 
Duke Blue Devils, Men
1935 establishments in North Carolina
Association football clubs established in 1935